Spirit of the Dawn was a British 692-ton iron barque that wrecked in the Antipodes Islands on . She was built at Sunderland in 1869 by T. R. Oswald and Co. and owned by J. Bell and Son of Liverpool.

Wreck and rescue 
On 4 September 1893, Spirit of the Dawn was en route from Rangoon, Burma, to Talcahuano, Chile, with a cargo of rice and under the command of Captain R. T. Millington. The ship encountered foggy weather in the Southern Ocean, struck rocks and sank, half a mile from the Antipodes Islands. Eleven of the crew took the boats and made it ashore but five other crew, including the captain, drowned.

The survivors lived on the archipelago's main island until they were rescued on 30 November, 88 days later, by  under the command of Captain Fairchild. The castaways lived through the entire ordeal without managing to light a fire once and survived eating raw eggs, birds, and roots. A castaway depot had been cached on the island, but the survivors never found it. 

The castaways were described as being in a "desperate state" by their rescuers. One crewmember, Felix Hewbert, required hospital treatment for frostbite on his right foot. He lost two toes and the first joint of the other toes from that foot. An enquiry was held in Wellington on 11 December, before the Resident Magistrate and Captain Adams. The court held that there was no evidence to show how the ship came to be in that position and that all hands had done what they could to save lives.

Crew 
The ships crew:

 Robert T. Millington, captain – drowned
 R. H. Horner, chief officer
 J. Morrissey, second officer
 Harry Davies, third officer
 E. M. Bergthiem, apprentice
 W. Clementson, apprentice
 Cetti, steward – drowned
 J. Petersen, carpenter – drowned
 John J. Peers, able seaman
 Thomas E. Ballard, able seaman
 Bernhard V. Anderson, able seaman
 C. D. Mason, able seaman
 Frank McLaughlin, able seaman
 Felix Hewbert, able seaman
 Frank Vautier, able seaman – drowned
 Peter Dawson, cook – drowned

References 

1869 ships
1893 in Antarctica
1893 in New Zealand
Antipodes Islands
History of the New Zealand outlying islands
Maritime incidents in 1893
Windjammers